José Alberto Moris (born 17 July 1939) is a Chilean footballer. He played in two matches for the Chile national football team in 1967. He was also part of Chile's squad for the 1967 South American Championship.

References

External links
 
 José Moris at PlaymakerStats
 José Moris at PartidosdeLaRoja 

1939 births
Living people
Footballers from Santiago
Chilean footballers
Chilean expatriate footballers
Chile international footballers
Association football midfielders
Universidad de Chile footballers
Club Deportivo Palestino footballers
Santiago Morning footballers
Deportes Colchagua footballers
C.D. Atlético Marte footballers
Chilean Primera División players
Primera B de Chile players
Salvadoran Primera División players
Liga Nacional de Fútbol de Guatemala players
Chilean expatriate sportspeople in El Salvador
Chilean expatriate sportspeople in Guatemala
Expatriate footballers in El Salvador
Expatriate footballers in Guatemala